The Rally of the Togolese People (RPT) was the ruling political party in Togo from 1969 to 2012. It was founded by President Gnassingbé Eyadéma and headed by his son, President Faure Gnassingbé, after the former's death in 2005. Faure Gnassingbé replaced the RPT with a new ruling party, the Union for the Republic (UNIR), in April 2012, dissolving the RPT.

History
The RPT was founded in late 1969, under President Gnassingbé Eyadéma. The party's first Secretary-General was Edem Kodjo.  It was the only legally permitted party in the country, a role further entrenched in a new constitution adopted in the 1979 referendum. Under its provisions, the president of the party was elected to a seven-year term as president of the republic, and confirmed in office by a plebiscite.

After 22 years of single-party rule by the RPT, a National Conference was held in July–August 1991, establishing a transitional government leading to multiparty elections. The RPT was legally dissolved by the National Conference on 27 August 1991. After the party was banned in November 1991 by the High Council of the Republic (the transitional parliament), a political crisis occurred in which soldiers loyal to Eyadéma, who demanded that the ban on the RPT be lifted, captured Prime Minister Joseph Kokou Koffigoh in December. Koffigoh was released after agreeing to the soldiers' demands and forming a new government that gave a RPT member secondary responsibility for military affairs (while Koffigoh himself remained Defense Minister). Eyadéma remained President throughout the crisis.

In the parliamentary election held on 27 October 2002, the party won 72 out of 81 seats in the National Assembly of Togo. Following the death of Eyadéma in February 2005, the RPT designated his son, Faure Gnassingbé, as the party's leader and its candidate in the presidential election of 24 April 2005, in which he won 60.2% of the vote.

The RPT's 9th Congress was held in December 2006, and Solitoki Esso was elected as the party's Secretary-General for a three-year term. Previous Secretaries-General include Koffi Sama, elected in late 2000, and Dama Dramani, elected in late 2003.

The RPT won 50 out of 81 National Assembly seats in the October 2007 parliamentary election.

Electoral history

Presidential elections

National Assembly elections

Notable politicians 
Kokou Agbemadon

References

External links
Official RPT website

African and Black nationalist parties in Africa
Defunct political parties in Togo
Parties of one-party systems
Political parties established in 1969
Political parties disestablished in 2012
1969 establishments in Africa
2012 disestablishments in Africa